The American White & American Creme Horse Registry was originally named the American Albino Horse Club and first established by Caleb Thompson and his wife, Ruth. 

In 1917, Caleb and his brother, Hudson, had bought a white stallion, Old King, and bred him with their Morgan mares. The horses' progeny were also white and the Thompsons called their horses 'American Albinos' although they were not true albinos.

After Hudson sold his stake in the business in 1936, Caleb and Ruth set up the registry to register Old King's progeny; the first horse to be registered was Old King's grandson, Snow King. They also registered other, unrelated white horses and the American Albino became a color breed.

The organization was known as the American Albino Association, Inc. and then the International American Albino Association, Inc. before being renamed the American White and American Creme Horse Registry in 1980.

References

Color breeds
Horse breed registries